Léo Ferré chante Baudelaire (English: "Léo Ferré sings Baudelaire") is an album by Léo Ferré, released in 1967 by Barclay Records. It is his fourth LP dedicated to a poet, after a first Baudelaire effort in 1957 (Les Fleurs du mal), Les Chansons d'Aragon in 1961, and  Verlaine et Rimbaud in 1964. It is also his second studio double album.

Track listing
Texts by Charles Baudelaire. Music composed by Léo Ferré.

Original LP

Personnel 
 The orchestra consists of session musicians hired for the recording

Credits 
 Arranger & orchestra conductor: Jean-Michel Defaye
 Director of engineering: Gerhard Lehner
 Executive producer: Jean Fernandez
 Artwork: Vanni Tealdi (first edition), Charles Szymkowicz (second edition)

References 

Léo Ferré albums
Les Fleurs du mal in popular culture
French-language albums
Barclay (record label) albums
1967 albums
Musical settings of poems by Charles Baudelaire